Tumkur is a panchayat village in the southern state of Karnataka, India. Administratively,Wadagera Taluka of Yadgir district in Karnataka. It lies on the left (east) bank of the Krishna River.  Tumkur is 10 km by road northwest of the village of Bendebembli and 31 km by road south of the town of Yadgir. The nearest rail station is Chegunda Station and the nearest railhead is in Yadgir.

Demographics 
At the 2001 census, Tumkur had 2,743 inhabitants, with 1,332 males and 1,411 females.

See also
 Shahapur
 Yadgir Habasihal

References

External links
 

Villages in Yadgir district